The Walls of Jerusalem National Park is a national park located in the Central Highlands region of Tasmania, Australia. It is south of Mole Creek, Tasmania, and Rowallan Lake. The national park forms part of the Tasmanian Wilderness World Heritage Area.

The locality of Walls of Jerusalem is in the local government areas of Central Highlands (36%) and Meander Valley (64%) in Tasmania.

Etymology and history
The park takes its name from the geological features of the park which are thought to resemble the walls of the city of Jerusalem. As a result, many places and features within the park also have Biblical references for names, such as Herods Gate, Lake Salome, Solomons Jewels, Damascus Gate, the Pool of Bethesda.

According to local legend, a prophet roams the wilderness, cursing the nations of the walkers who enter the park.

Features

Much of the walking track consists of raised boards, from Wild Dog Creek through to Dixon's Kingdom, with the purpose of protecting the fragile alpine vegetation. Walking tracks elsewhere in the park consist of rock, rocky earth, grassland and marsh.

In film
Some scenes for the second episode of the BBC documentary series Walking with Dinosaurs were filmed here.

Geography

Road infrastructure
The C171 route (Mersey Forest Road) runs south just outside the north-western boundary (in the locality of Mersey Forest) to the Walls of Jerusalem car park, where it ends.

See also 

 Protected areas of Tasmania
 Savage River National Park
 Qantas Flight 1737

References

External links
 

 
National parks of Tasmania
Central Highlands (Tasmania)
Protected areas established in 1978
Wilderness areas of Tasmania
1978 establishments in Australia
Tasmanian Wilderness World Heritage Area
Localities of Central Highlands Council
Localities of Meander Valley Council
Towns in Tasmania